The Jor Bagh Metro Station is located on the Yellow Line of the Delhi Metro.

It is the northernmost station on Aurobindo Marg, and is located near the Lodhi Road crossing. A Mughal mausoleum, Safdarjung's Tomb, is located nearby. It is also close to Safdarjung Airport.

Station layout

Facilities

Entry/exit

Connections

Bus
Delhi Transport Corporation bus routes number 335, 336A, 344, 400, 433, 433CL, 433LnkSTL, 460, 460CL, 460STL, 480, 500, 502, 503, 505, 520, 540, 540CL, 548, 548CL, 548EXT, 578A,588, 605, 615, 621, 624ACL, 624ALinkSTL, 719, 725, 745, 794,878+578LT, AC-615, serves the station from nearby S.J. Madrasa bus stop.

See also 
New Delhi
List of Delhi Metro stations
Transport in Delhi
Delhi Metro Rail Corporation
Delhi Suburban Railway
Delhi Transport Corporation
Central Delhi
National Capital Region (India)
List of rapid transit systems
List of metro systems

References

External links 

 Delhi Metro Rail Corporation Ltd. (Official site)
 Delhi Metro Annual Reports
 

Delhi Metro stations
Railway stations opened in 2010
2010 establishments in Delhi
Railway stations in South East Delhi district